Wake turbulence is a disturbance in the atmosphere that forms behind an aircraft as it passes through the air. It includes a variety of elements, the most significant of which are wingtip vortices and jetwash. Jetwash refers to the rapidly moving gases expelled from a jet engine; it is extremely turbulent but of short duration. Wingtip vortices, however, are much more stable and can remain in the air for up to three minutes after the passage of an aircraft. It is therefore not true turbulence in the aerodynamic sense, as true turbulence would be chaotic. Instead, it refers to the similarity to atmospheric turbulence as experienced by an aircraft flying through this region of disturbed air.

Wingtip vortices occur when a wing is generating lift. Air from below the wing is drawn around the wingtip into the region above the wing by the lesser amount of pressure above the wing, causing a vortex to trail from each wingtip. The strength of wingtip vortices is determined primarily by the weight and airspeed of the aircraft. Wingtip vortices make up the primary and most dangerous component of wake turbulence.

Wake turbulence is especially hazardous in the region behind an aircraft in the takeoff or landing phases of flight. During take-off and landing, an aircraft operates at a high angle of attack. This flight attitude maximizes the formation of strong vortices. In the vicinity of an airport, there can be multiple aircraft, all operating at low speed and low altitude; this provides an extra risk of wake turbulence with a reduced height from which to recover from any upset.

Definition
Wake turbulence is a type of clear-air turbulence. In the case of wake turbulence created by the wings of a heavy aircraft, the rotating vortex-pair lingers for a significant amount of time after the passage of the aircraft, sometimes more than a minute. One of these rotating vortices can seriously upset or even invert a smaller aircraft that encounters it, either in the air or on the ground.

In fixed wing–level flight
At altitude, vortices sink at a rate of 90 to 150 meters per minute and stabilize about 150 to 270 meters below the flight level of the generating aircraft. For this reason, aircraft operating greater than 600 metres above the terrain are considered to be at less risk.

Helicopters
Helicopters also produce wake turbulence. Helicopter wakes may be of significantly greater strength than those from a fixed-wing aircraft of the same weight. The strongest wake can occur when the helicopter is operating at lower speeds (20 to 50 knots). Some mid-size or executive class helicopters produce wake as strong as that of heavier helicopters. This is because two-blade main rotor systems, typical of lighter helicopters, produce a stronger wake than rotor systems with more blades. The strong rotor wake of the Bell Boeing V-22 Osprey tiltrotor can extend beyond the description in the manual, which contributed to a crash.

Hazard avoidance
Many aircraft are now made with wingtip devices to improve both the lift-to-drag ratio and fuel economy. such devices may also marginally reduce the strength of the wingtip vortices. However, such changes are not operationally significant i.e. do not change the distances or times at which it is safe to follow other aircraft.

Wake turbulence categories

ICAO mandates wake turbulence categories based upon the maximum takeoff weight (MTOW) of the aircraft. These are used for the purpose of separation of aircraft during take-off and landing.

There are a number of separation criteria for take-off, landing and en-route phases of flight based upon wake turbulence categories. Air Traffic Controllers will sequence aircraft making instrument approaches with regard to these minima. Aircraft making a visual approach are advised of the relevant recommended spacing and are expected to maintain their own separation.

Parallel or crossing runways

During takeoff and landing, an aircraft's wake sinks toward the ground and moves laterally away from the runway when the wind is calm. A  crosswind will tend to keep the upwind side of the wake in the runway area and may cause the downwind side to drift toward another runway. Since the wingtip vortices exist at the outer edge of an airplane's wake, this can be dangerous.

Staying on or above leader's glide path
Glider pilots routinely practice flying in wingtip vortices when they do a maneuver called "boxing the wake." This involves descending from the higher to lower position behind a tow plane. This is followed by making a rectangular figure by holding the glider at high and low points away from the towing plane before coming back up through the vortices. Given the relatively slow speeds and lightness of both aircraft the procedure is safe but does instill a sense of how strong and where the turbulence is located.

Incident data shows that the greatest potential for a wake vortex incident occurs when a light aircraft is turning from base to final behind a heavy aircraft flying a straight-in approach. Light aircraft pilots must use extreme caution and intercept their final approach path above or well behind the heavier aircraft's path. When a visual approach following a preceding aircraft is issued and accepted, the pilot is required to establish a safe landing interval behind the aircraft he was instructed to follow. The pilot is responsible for wake turbulence separation. Pilots must not decrease the separation that existed when the visual approach was issued unless they can remain on or above the flight path of the preceding aircraft. Having a higher approach path and touching down further along the runway than the previous aircraft will help avoid wake turbulence.

Warning signs

Any uncommanded aircraft movements (such as wing rocking) may be caused by wake. This is why maintaining situational awareness is critical. Ordinary turbulence is not unusual, particularly in the approach phase. A pilot who suspects wake turbulence is affecting his or her aircraft should get away from the wake, execute a missed approach or go-around and be prepared for a stronger wake encounter. The onset of wake can be subtle and even surprisingly gentle. There have been serious accidents (see the next section) where pilots have attempted to salvage a landing after encountering moderate wake only to encounter severe wake turbulence that they were unable to overcome. Pilots should not depend on any aerodynamic warning, but if the onset of wake is occurring, immediate evasive action is vital.

Incidents involving wake turbulence

8 June 1966 – an XB-70 collided with an F-104. Though the true cause of the collision is unknown, it is believed that due to the XB-70 being designed to have an enhanced wake turbulence to increase lift, the F-104 moved too close, therefore getting caught in the vortex and colliding with the wing (see main article).
 A DC-9 crashed at the Greater Southwest International Airport while performing "touch and go" landings behind a DC-10. This crash prompted the FAA to create new rules for minimum following separation from "heavy" aircraft.<
16 Jan 1987 – A Yakovlev Yak-40 crashed just after take-off in Tashkent. The flight took off just one minute fifteen seconds after an Ilyushin Il-76, thus encountering its wake vortex. The Yakovlev Yak-40 then banked sharply to the right, struck the ground, and caught fire. All nine people on board Aeroflot Flight 505 died.
15 December 1993 – a chartered aircraft with five people on board, including In-N-Out Burger's president, Rich Snyder, crashed several miles before John Wayne Airport in Orange County, California. The aircraft was following a Boeing 757 for landing, became caught in its wake turbulence, rolled into a deep descent and crashed. As a result of this and other incidents involving aircraft following behind a Boeing 757, the FAA now employs the separation rules of heavy aircraft for the Boeing 757.
8 September 1994 – USAir Flight 427 crashed near Pittsburgh, Pennsylvania. This accident was believed to involve wake turbulence, though the primary cause was a defective rudder control component which caused the aircraft to react abnormally to the pilots' control inputs prompted by the wake encounter.
20 September 1999 – A JAS 39A Gripen from Airwing F 7 Såtenäs crashed into Lake Vänern in Sweden during an air combat maneuvering exercise. After passing through the wake vortex of the other aircraft, the Gripen abruptly changed course, and pilot Capt. Rickard Mattsson, got a highest-severity warning from the ground-collision warning system. He ejected from the aircraft, and landed safely by parachute in the lake.
12 November 2001 – American Airlines Flight 587 crashed into the Belle Harbor neighborhood of Queens, New York shortly after takeoff from John F. Kennedy International Airport. The accident was attributed to the first officer's misuse of the rudder in response to wake turbulence from a Japan Airlines Boeing 747, resulting in the overstressing and separation of the vertical stabilizer.
8 July 2008 – A US Air Force PC-12 trainer crashed at Hurlburt Field, Fla., because the pilot tried to land too closely behind a larger AC-130U Spooky gunship and got caught in the gunship's wake turbulence. Air Force rules require at least a two-minute separation between slow-moving heavy planes like the AC-130U and small, light planes, but the PC-12 trailed the gunship by about 40 seconds. As the PC-12 hit the wake turbulence, it suddenly rolled to the left and began to turn upside down.
3 November 2008 – Wake turbulence of an Airbus A380-800 causing temporary loss of control to a Saab 340 on approach to a parallel runway during high crosswind conditions.
4 November 2008 – In the infamous 2008 Mexico City plane crash, a LearJet 45 XC-VMC carrying Mexican Interior Secretary Juan Camilo Mouriño, crashed near Paseo de la Reforma Avenue before turning for final approach to runway 05R at Mexico City International Airport. The airplane was flying behind a 767-300 and above a heavy helicopter. The pilots were not told about the type of plane that was approaching before them, nor did they reduce to minimum approach speed. (This has been confirmed as the official stance by the Mexican Government as stated by Luiz Tellez, the Secretary of Communications of Mexico.)
 9 September 2012 – a Robin DR 400 crashed after rolling 90 degrees in a wake turbulence induced by the preceding Antonov AN-2, three killed, one severely injured.
 28 March 2014 – an Indian Air Force C-130J-30 KC-3803 crashed near Gwalior, India, killing all five personnel aboard. The aircraft was conducting low level penetration training by flying at around  when it ran into wake turbulence from the other C-130J aircraft that was leading the formation, which caused it to crash.
 7 January 2017 – a private Bombardier Challenger 604 rolled three times in midair and dropped  after encountering wake turbulence when it passed  under an Airbus A380 over the Arabian Sea. Several passengers were injured, one seriously. Due to the G-forces experienced, the plane was damaged beyond repair and was consequently written off.
 14 June 2018 – At 11:29 pm, Qantas passenger flight QF94 en route from Los Angeles to Melbourne suffered a sudden freefall over the ocean after lift-off as a result of an intense wake vortex. The event lasted for about ten seconds, according to the passengers. The turbulence was caused by the wake of the previous Qantas flight QF12, which had departed only two minutes prior to flight QF94.

Measurement
Wake turbulence can be measured using several techniques. Currently, ICAO recognizes two methods of measurement, sound tomography, and a high-resolution technique is Doppler lidar, a solution now commercially available. Techniques using optics can use the effect of turbulence on refractive index (optical turbulence) to measure the distortion of light that passes through the turbulent area and indicate the strength of that turbulence.

Audibility

Wake turbulence can occasionally, under the right conditions, be heard by ground observers. On a still day, the wake turbulence from heavy jets on landing approach can be heard as a dull roar or whistle. This is the strong core of the vortex. If the aircraft produces a weaker vortex, the breakup will sound like tearing a piece of paper. Often, it is first noticed some seconds after the direct noise of the passing aircraft has diminished. The sound then gets louder. Nevertheless, being highly directional, wake turbulence sound is easily perceived as originating a considerable distance behind the aircraft, its apparent source moving across the sky just as the aircraft did. It can persist for 30 seconds or more, continually changing timbre, sometimes with swishing and cracking notes, until it finally dies away.

In popular culture

In the 1986 film Top Gun, Lieutenant Pete "Maverick" Mitchell, played by Tom Cruise, suffers two flameouts caused by passing through the jetwash of another aircraft, piloted by fellow aviator Tom "Ice Man" Kazansky (played by Val Kilmer). As a result, he is put into an unrecoverable spin and is forced to eject, killing his RIO Nick "Goose" Bradshaw. In a subsequent incident, he is caught in an enemy fighter's jetwash, but manages to recover safely.

In the movie Pushing Tin, air traffic controllers stand just off the threshold of a runway while an aircraft lands in order to experience wake turbulence firsthand. However, the film dramatically exaggerates the effect of turbulence on persons standing on the ground, showing the protagonists being blown about by the passing aircraft. In reality, the turbulence behind and below a landing aircraft is too gentle to knock over a person standing on the ground. (In contrast, jet blast from an aircraft taking off can be extremely dangerous to people standing behind the aircraft.)

See also

Batchelor vortex
Eddy (fluid dynamics)
Wake (of boats)
Wingtip device

References

External links
 Captain Meryl Getline explains "Heavy"
 U.S. FAA, The Aeronautical Information Manual on Wake Turbulence
 U.S. FAA, Pilot Controller Glossary, see Aircraft Classes
 Wake Turbulence, An Invisible Enemy
 Photographs of Wake turbulence
 NASA Dryden – Wake Vortex Research

Aviation risks
Air traffic control
Turbulence
Aircraft wing design
Aerodynamics

ca:Estela